Hilee Delano Taylor (born July 18, 1986) is a former American football defensive end. He was drafted by the Carolina Panthers in the seventh round of the 2008 NFL Draft. He played college football at North Carolina. He was also a member of the NFL's Detroit Lions and Tampa Bay Buccaneers, as well as the CFL's Saskatchewan Roughriders.

Family and personal life 
Taylor began playing football at the early age of 5. His father died in late December 2017.

College career
As a senior at the University of North Carolina, Taylor led the Tar Heels and finished tied for 11th in the nation with 10.5 sacks. He also registered 16 of his 49 tackles for loss and forced three fumbles.

Professional career
Taylor was drafted in the seventh round of the 2008 NFL Draft by the Carolina Panthers. In three seasons in Carolina, he recorded four tackles and one sack. After the 2011 NFL Lockout ended, he was waived by the Panthers and claimed off waivers by the Detroit Lions. However, he opted not to report to the Lions and retire from football. On November 9, Taylor unretired and was reinstated by the NFL. He was released by the Lions following his reinstatement.

On May 6, 2012, Taylor signed with the Tampa Bay Buccaneers.

On March 15, 2013, Taylor signed a two year contract with the Saskatchewan Roughriders in the Canadian Football League.

External links
Carolina Panthers bio
Saskatchewan Roughriders bio
North Carolina Tar Heels bio

1986 births
Living people
People from Laurinburg, North Carolina
Players of American football from North Carolina
American football defensive ends
Canadian football defensive linemen
African-American players of American football
African-American players of Canadian football
North Carolina Tar Heels football players
Carolina Panthers players
Detroit Lions players
Tampa Bay Buccaneers players
Saskatchewan Roughriders players
21st-century African-American sportspeople
20th-century African-American people